The Post Attack Command and Control System (PACCS) was a network of communication sites (both ground and airborne) for use before, during and after a nuclear attack on the United States. PACCS was designed to ensure that National Command Authority would retain exclusive and complete control over US nuclear weapons. Among other components, it included Strategic Air Command assets such as the Looking Glass aircraft and mission, and various hardened command and control facilities.

The belief by the Soviet Union in the reliability of PACCS was a crucial component of the US mutual assured destruction doctrine, ensuring a long-term stalemate.

History
The Strategic Air Command headquarters staff, under the direction of General Thomas S. Power assessed the feasibility of placing a continuous command and control element in an airborne mode. The purpose of such a system would be to use the aircraft as a platform for specially installed communications equipment to ensure delivery of command directives to SAC strike forces in the event ground-based headquarters were destroyed.

The original plan envisioned an aircraft, crew, and command and control team on 15-minute ground alert. This was later changed to a continuous airborne alert posture. The functions of this PACCS Airborne Command Post kept expanding until it became a true alternate command and control system, complete with force status monitoring, initiation or relay of launch/execution directives, a battle staff, communications to support an alternate CINCSAC, and limited capabilities to reconstitute and replan residual resources.

PACCS, in later variants, included an Airborne Launch Control System (ALCS) capability, which provided an alternate means for execution message delivery to missile combat crews and a back-up launch control center, forcing the Soviet Union to target each missile silo, rather than just the launch control centers to incapacitate the Minuteman force.

Components

Airborne
E-4B National Emergency Airborne Command Post (NEACP)
1st Airborne Command and Control Squadron - Offutt Air Force Base, Nebraska
EC-135 Airborne Command Post (ABNCP) "Looking Glass"
2d Airborne Command and Control Squadron - Offutt Air Force Base, Nebraska
4th Airborne Command and Control Squadron - Ellsworth Air Force Base, South Dakota
22d Air Refueling Squadron - March Air Force Base, California; West Auxiliary Command Post (West AUXCP) 
Ground Entry Point - Lamar, Colorado
99th Air Refueling Squadron - Westover Air Force Base, Massachusetts; East Auxiliary Command Post (East AUXCP) 
Ground Entry Point - Plano, Illinois
913th Air Refueling Squadron - Barksdale Air Force Base, Louisiana; Central Auxiliary Command Post (Central AUX)
Ground Entry Point - Lyons, Nebraska
EB-47L
4362d Post Attack Command and Control Squadron - Lincoln Air Force Base, Nebraska
4363d Post Attack Command and Control Squadron - Lockbourne Air Force Base, Ohio
4364th Post Attack Command and Control Squadron - Mountain Home Air Force Base, Idaho
4365th Post Attack Command and Control Squadron - Plattsburgh Air Force Base, New York

Ground
 Barksdale Air Force Base, Louisiana (Second Air Force (later Eighth Air Force) Command Post)
 Westover Air Force Base, Massachusetts (Eighth Air Force Combat Operations Center, aka "The Notch")
 March Air Force Base, California (Fifteenth Air Force Command Post)
Grissom Air Force Base, Indiana
 Offutt Air Force Base, Nebraska (Strategic Air Command Headquarters)
Headquarters Emergency Relocation Team (HERT) - Cornhusker Army Ammunition Plant, Grand Island, Nebraska

Communications
Survivable Low Frequency Communications System - VLF/LF
Alpha and Bravo Nets - High Frequency
Green Pine
Emergency Rocket Communications System

Gallery

See also
Airborne Launch Control Center
Survivable Low Frequency Communications System (SLFCS)
Ground Wave Emergency Network (GWEN)
Minimum Essential Emergency Communications Network (MEECN)
Emergency Rocket Communications System (ERCS)
Alternate Reconstitution Base (ARB)
Cold War
Game theory
Continuity of government

References

External links
WWABNCP/PACCS patches

Telecommunications equipment of the Cold War
United States nuclear command and control
Continuity of government in the United States
Nuclear bunkers in the United States